Revolutionary Communist Organisation, Nepal was a communist faction in Nepal. The group operated in the Bagmati, Janakpur and Koshi zones. The group publish Vargyuddha (Class War).

In April 1980, the group merged into the Communist Party of Nepal (Marxist-Leninist).

Sources
Rawal, Bhim Bahadur. Nepalma samyabadi andolan: udbhab ra vikas. Kathmandu: Pairavi Prakashan. p. 84, 163.

Defunct communist parties in Nepal
Organizations disestablished in 1980
1980 disestablishments in Asia